Straight from the Heart is the tenth studio album by American singer-songwriter Peabo Bryson. It was released in 1984 on Elektra Records, his first of four discs for the label. The album peaked at number 44 on the US Billboard 200, and produced three singles, including his first top ten pop hit "If Ever You're in My Arms Again" which also topped the Adult contemporary chart. Bryson himself co-produced the record, as well as writing five of the eight songs himself and playing keyboards throughout the album.

Critical reception

In a retrospective review, William Ruhlmann of AllMusic called Straight from the Heart "a good mix of slow and uptempo tunes."

Track listing

Personnel 
Musicians

 Peabo Bryson – lead vocals, Memorymoog (1, 3, 7, 8), percussion solo (1), rhythm arrangements (1), backing vocals (3, 7), arrangements (3, 4, 7, 8), Yamaha DX7 (4, 7)
 Myra Walker – acoustic piano (1, 3, 7, 8), Fender Rhodes (1, 7, 8), Oberheim OB-X (3), backing vocals (3, 7), Yamaha DX7 (4)
 Mark Parrish – Memorymoog (1, 8), Prophet-5 (7)
 Trammell Starks – Memorymoog (1, 3, 4, 7, 8), Yamaha DX7 (4, 7)
 Randy Kerber – acoustic piano (2, 6), Yamaha DX7 (2, 6)
 Rick Kelly – keyboards (5)
 John Hauser – electric guitar (1, 3)
 Paul Jackson Jr. – guitar (2, 6)
 Richard Horton – electric guitar (3, 7), acoustic guitar (8)
 Richard Feldman – guitar (5)
 Dwight W. Watkins – bass (1, 3, 8), Oberheim OB-X (3), backing vocals (3), flugelhorn (8)
 Neil Stubenhaus – bass (2, 6)
 Louis Johnson – bass (5)
 Andre Robinson – Simmons drums (1, 3, 7, 8)
 Carlos Vega – drums (2, 6)
 John Robinson – drums (5)
 Charles Bryson – percussion (1)
 Michael Fisher – percussion (5)
 Ron Dover – tenor saxophone (3, 8), soprano saxophone (8), flute (8)
 James Bowling – flute (8)
 Michael Masser – rhythm track arrangements (2, 6)
 Gene Page – rhythm track arrangements (2, 6)
 Lee Holdridge – string arrangements and conductor (2, 6)
 Richard Marx – backing vocals (2, 6)
 Deborah Thomas – backing vocals (2, 6)
 Lynn Davis – backing vocals (5)
 Josie James – backing vocals (5)
 Marcy Levy – backing vocals (5)
 Samuel T. Dukes – backing vocals (7)

Production

 Producers – Peabo Bryson (Tracks 1, 3, 4, 7 & 8); Michael Masser (Tracks 2 & 6); Richard Feldman and Rick Kelly (Track 5).
 Assistant Producer – Dwight Watkins
 Engineers – Russ Fowler (Tracks 1, 3, 4, 5, 7 & 8); Michael Mancini and Bill Schnee (Tracks 2 & 6); Richard Feldman and Rick Kelly (Track 5).
 Assistant Engineer on Tracks 1, 3, 4, 5, 7 & 8 – Don M. Radick
 Mixing – Peabo Bryson, Russ Fowler and Dwight Watkins (Tracks 1, 3, 4, 5, 7 & 8).
 Recorded and Mixed at Cheshire Sound Studios (Atlanta, GA).
 Track 5 recorded at Orca Studios (Encino, CA).
 Rhythm Tracks and Vocals on Tracks 2 & 6 recorded at Devonshire Sound Studios (Burbank, CA).
 Strings recorded at Evergreen Studios (Burbank, CA).
 Mixed at Bill Schnee Studios (Los Angeles, CA).
 Mastered by Doug Sax at The Mastering Lab (Los Angeles, CA).
 Art Direction – HSU
 Photography – Beverly Parker

Charts

References

Peabo Bryson albums
1984 albums
Elektra Records albums
Albums arranged by Gene Page
Albums arranged by Lee Holdridge
Albums produced by Michael Masser